Kambagi is a panchayat village in the southern state of Karnataka, India. Administratively it is under Vijayapur Taluk of Vijayapur District, Karnataka. Kambagi has Government Primary HealthCare Center, Post Office, Bank of India and Gram Panchayat offices.

There are two other villages included the Kambagi Gram Panchayat: Hanamasagar and Madagunaki.

Demographics

In the 2001 India census, the village of Kambagi had a population of 3,663, with 1,850 males and 1,813 females.

In the 2011 census, the village of Kambagi had a population of 3,095.

History

Historical Hanuman temple is present.

Geography

Village is situated geographically at 16* 32' 10 north latitude and 75* 31' 19 east longitude.

Temples
Shri Chandraprabhu Basti
Shri Hanuman Temple, 
Shri AmoghaSiddeshwar Temple, 
Shri Durga Devi Temple, 
Shri Pandurang Temple, 
Shri Mallikarjun Temple.

Religion
Village is having mainly Hindu and Muslim community people.

Language
People speak mainly in Kannada.

Mosques
Mosque and Maszid for Muslim community. Moharam and Uras festivals are celebrated by both Hindu and Muslim religion.

Agriculture

The village land is quite fertile, with over 70% of it being well-suited to cultivation and crop production. Farmers there grow mainly sugar cane, grapes, maize, and sorghum. Small areas are planted in citrus orchards, and crops such as onions and turmeric. Irrigation is mainly based upon distribution canals from the river, borewells and open wells.

Industry

Near by Kambagi there is one sugar industry, i.e.,Someshwar Sugar Mills Pvt, Ltd Kambagi.

Transportation

Village is connected to the main town Bijapur via Galagali and Babaleshwar has 45 km and is also connected to surrounding villages: Hanamasagar, Nadyal, Katral, Bolachikkalaki, Madagunaki, Devar-Gennur, Devapur, Mamadapur and Sangapur (SH).

Education

In village a Govt Higher Primary School (HPS, Kambagi) has currently working with 1st to 7th standard having more than 200 students and a Government High School is also working with 8th to 10th Standards having more than 100 students. The whole village having more than 65% of literacy rate.

 Govt Higher Primary School (HPS), Kambagi
 Govt High School, Kambagi
 Shivagiri Pre-Primary School, Kambagi
 Shivagiri Pre-University College, Kambagi

Charitable Organizations/Trusts

There are various associations doing cultural, sports, programmes and other activities.

Festivals

The main celebrations of the year are Jai hanuman Okali and Shri Hari Pandurang Vittal Saptaha( Dindhi). Also celebrated each year are Kara Hunnume, Nagara Panchami, Deepavli, Ugadi, and Dassara.

Literacy Rate
The village literacy rate is about 75%. Males has 75% and Female has 65% of literacy.

Politics
Village is comes under Babaleshwar Assembly Constituency and Vijayapur Parliamentary Constituency.

BANK
BANK OF INDIA

Telephone Code
 Babaleshwar - 08355

PIN Code
 Sarawad - 586125
Post office is in Kambagi and main post office is in Sarawad.

State Highway
State Highway - 55 is passes by village.

State Highway - 55 => Babaleshwar - Kambagi - Galagali- Mudhol - Yadawad - Yaragatti

References

External links
 

Villages in Bijapur district, Karnataka